This is a list of theatrically released feature films that are based on British television programmes.

Comedy

Drama

Science fiction

Documentary

Children's television

See also
 List of films based on television programs
 Cinema of the United Kingdom

Notes

References 

Films
Television
Films based on television series
F
Lists of films and television series